The Thirty-First of February is a collection of fantasy stories by American writer Nelson Bond. It was released in 1949 by Gnome Press in an edition of 5,000 copies.  Most of the stories had previously appeared in the magazines Blue Book, Unknown, Fantastic Adventures, Esquire and Amazing Stories.

Contents
 Introduction, by James Branch Cabell
 "The Sportsman"
 "The Mask of Medusa"
 "My Nephew Norvell"
 "The Ring"
 "The Gripes of Wraith"
 "The Cunning of the Beast"
 "The Five Lives of Robert Jordan"
 "Take My Drum to England—"
 "Saint Mulligan"
 "The Monster from Nowhere"
 "The Man Who Walked Through Glass"
 "The Enchanted Pencil"
 "Pilgrimage"

Reception
Astounding reviewer Forrest J Ackerman punningly praised the collection as "first-class funtasy, leavened with a soupcon of sobriety."

References

Sources

External links

1949 short story collections
Fantasy short story collections
Works by Nelson S. Bond
Gnome Press books